Brodmann area 35, together with Brodmann area 36, comprise the perirhinal cortex. They are cytoarchitecturally defined temporal regions of the cerebral cortex.

Human Brodmann area 35
This area is known as perirhinal area 35. It is a subdivision of the cytoarchitecturally defined hippocampal region of the cerebral cortex. In the human it is located along the rhinal sulcus. Cytoarchitectually it is bounded medially by the entorhinal area 28 and laterally by the ectorhinal area 36 (H).

Monkey Brodmann area 35
Brodmann found a cytoarchitecturally homologous area in the monkey (Cercopithecus), but it was so weakly developed that he omitted it from the cortical map of that species (Brodmann-1909).

Brodmann area 36
With its medial boundary corresponding approximately to the rhinal sulcus it is located primarily in the fusiform gyrus. Cytoarchitecturally it is bounded laterally and caudally by the inferior temporal area 20, medially by the area 35 and rostrally by the temporopolar area 38 (H) (Brodmann-1909). Its function is part of the formation/consolidation and retrieval of declarative/hippocampal memory amongst others for faces.

See also
 Brodmann area

References

External links

 For Neuroanatomy of this area see BrainInfo

35
Medial surface of cerebral hemisphere